"Love Meeting Love" is a song written by Mark King and Boon Gould, and released in 1980 by the British musical group Level 42 on Elite Records. It was the band's second single and the first Level 42 song that entered in the UK single charts, reaching #61. It wasn't until two years later that this song was featured on a studio album: The Early Tapes/Strategy, released by Polydor Records.

The song was released only in the United Kingdom.

References

1980 singles
Level 42 songs
Songs written by Mark King (musician)
Songs written by Boon Gould
1980 songs